Barbatia amygdalumtostum, the almond ark or burnt-almond ark, is a species of bearded ark clams in the Barbatia genus discovered by Röding in 1798. Barbatia amygdalumtostum lives in ocean environments.
<div align=center>

</div align=center>

References 

amygdalumtostum